Saint-Denis-le-Thiboult is a commune in the Seine-Maritime department in the Normandy region in northern France.

Geography
The small river Crevon, a tributary of the Andelle, flows through the commune.

Population

Places of interest
 The church of St. Denis, dating from the thirteenth century.
 A sixteenth-century manorhouse with a dovecote.
 The chateau of Ventes.
 A feudal motte and walls.

See also
Communes of the Seine-Maritime department

References

Communes of Seine-Maritime